The following elections occurred in the year 1871.

 1871 Chilean presidential election
 1871 New Zealand general election

Africa
 French legislative election in Algeria
 general election in Liberia 
 French legislative election in Senegal

Europe
 1871 Dutch general election
 July 1871 French by-elections
 February 1871 French legislative election and July 1871 French by-elections 
 1871 German federal election
 1871 Portuguese legislative election
 elections in Spain 
 UK: 
 1871 Dover by-election
 January and April 1871 Durham City by-election 
 1871 East Surrey by-election
 1871 Galway County by-election
 1871 Halifax by-election
 1871 Hereford by-election
 1871 Limerick City by-election 
 1871 County Limerick by-election
 1871 Meath by-election
 1871 Monaghan by-election
 1871 Monmouthshire by-election
 1871 Newry by-election
 1871 Norwich by-election
 1871 Plymouth by-election
 1871 Ripon by-election
 1871 South Norfolk by-election
 1871 Stalybridge by-election
 1871 Tamworth by-election
 1871 Truro by-election
 1871 West Norfolk by-election
 1871 West Staffordshire by-election
 1871 Westmeath by-election
 1871 Westmorland by-election
 1871 York by-election

North America

Canada
 1871 British Columbia general election
 1871 Nova Scotia general election
 1871 Ontario general election
 1871 Quebec general election
 By-elections to the 1st Canadian Parliament

United States
 California: 
 1871 United States House of Representatives elections in California
 1871 California gubernatorial election 
 Georgia: US Senate special elections 
 Illinois: 
 1871 Chicago mayoral election
 Illinois's at-large congressional district special election
 Kansas: US Senate election
 Kentucky: US Senate election
 Massachusetts: US Senate election
 Michigan: US Senate election 
 Minnesota: 
 US Senate election 
 US Senate special election 
 gubernatorial election
 New Hampshire: US House of Representatives elections
 New Jersey: gubernatorial election
 New York: state election
 Texas: 
 US House of Representatives elections 
 US Senate election
 Virginia: US Senate election
 West Virginia: US Senate election

See also
 :Category:1871 elections

1871
Elections